Altoona Rail Kings were a former Independent baseball team, playing their home games at Veterans Memorial Field in Altoona, Pennsylvania averaging nearly 1,200 fans per game.

They played two seasons, 1996 in the North Atlantic League, and 1997 in the Heartland League. In 1996, the Rail Kings finished 36-42. In 1997, they finished 22-14 in the Northern Division's first half, and 14-22 in the second. The Rail Kings were a formidable opponent during their time in Altoona, finishing second and third place in their respective leagues. They did make the playoffs, losing in two straight games to the Anderson Lawmen.

When the Pittsburgh Pirates-affiliated AA franchise was awarded to Altoona, the Rail Kings relocated to Huntington, West Virginia, for the 1998 season. They retained the Rail King name but redesigned their logo to feature a crowned H rather than an A. 

The Kings remained in the Heartland League. The Huntington Rail Kings did not finish the 1998 season, closing due to poor attendance. The Altoona Curve arrived in Altoona in 1999.

Today, the Rail Kings name lives on at Blair County Ballpark, where the best seats are designated "Rail King." The Rail Kings' mascot was R.K. Two other names considered for the team were used later by affiliated teams: the Spikes, now used by State College, and the Curve, used by the current AA team. 

Players for the initial season included:

Jeff Andrews
Eric Burroughs
Mike Cacciotti
Peter Dallas
Howard Hill
Mark Hilyard
Anthony Iasparro
Karun Jackson
Farley Love
Travis Maxwell
Carlos Mirabal
Tim Mitchell
Paul Neatrour
Manny Perez
Billy Reed
Stanley Scales
Ray Schmittle
Anthony Sharer
John Smith
Doug Smyly
Tony Webster
Eric Yelding
Tommy Seasoltz (batboy)

 
Management included:

Owner/President: Eric Reichert
General Manager: Mike Richmond
Director of Media Relations: Dave Shannon
Director of Sales and Marketing: Shawn McIntire
Account Executive: Eddie Depp
Manager: Tommy Hearn
Coach: Michael Richmond
Athletic trainer:Bryant Musselman

References

Defunct independent baseball league teams
Altoona, Pennsylvania
1996 establishments in Pennsylvania
Sports clubs disestablished in 1996
1997 disestablishments in Pennsylvania
Defunct baseball teams in Pennsylvania
Baseball teams established in 1996
Baseball teams disestablished in 1997
North Atlantic League teams